Alexander Ramati (December 20, 1921 – February 18, 2006), born David Solomonovich Grinberg, was a Polish writer and film director.

Biography
Alexander Ramati was born in Brest, Belarus, then part of Poland, into a Jewish family.

During World War II he worked as a war journalist. He entered Assisi with the Allied forces in June 1944, and there he first met Rufino Niccacci. Later he interviewed him and wrote The Assisi Underground, published in 1978. In 1985 he directed a film adaptation of the book.

In 1985 he wrote And the Violins Stopped Playing: A Story of the Gypsy Holocaust, which he also adapted to a movie, in 1988.

He died in Montreux, Switzerland.

Bibliography
 Beyond the Mountains, also published as The Desperate Ones (novel) (1958)
 The Assisi Underground (1978)
 And the Violins Stopped Playing: A Story of the Gypsy Holocaust (1986)

Selected filmography
 The Desperate Ones (1967)
 The Assisi Underground (1985)
 And the Violins Stopped Playing (1988)

References

External links
 

Polish male writers
Polish film directors
20th-century Polish Jews
1921 births
2006 deaths
Writers from Brest, Belarus
Polish expatriates in Switzerland